Geoffrey Lewis Austin (11 September 1837 – 29 May 1902) was a British Army officer, cricket administrator and cricketer.

Austin was born at Canterbury in Kent, the youngest son of George and Eliza Austin. His father worked as a solicitor and was High Seneschal of Canterbury Cathedral. Austin was educated at The King's School in the city and lived in the Cathedral precincts throughout his life.

Cricket
A keen sportsman, Austin was described as "a capital shot, an expert angler and an enthusiastic and successful golfer". He played in three first-class cricket matches, two for Kent County Cricket Club and one for the Gentlemen of Kent, in the 1860s as well as in other matches for sides such as Band of Brothers, an amateur side closely associated with the Kent county club.

Austin is more notable as the second manager of Canterbury Cricket Week, taking over the role from William de Chair Baker. He was a "popular" manager of the week, at the time an important social event, and served on the Kent Committee for a number of years.

Military service
He joined the Rifle Brigade and was commissioned as an Ensign in April 1855 before being promoted to Lieutenant later the same year. He served throughout the Indian Mutiny of 1857 and saw action at the Siege of Cawnpore, the Siege of Lucknow and at the capture of Calpee with Ross' Camel Corps. He was promoted to Captain in 1863 and resigned from the regular army with this rank, joining the Royal East Kent Mounted Rifles, a reserve unit.

Family
Austin did not marry and lived with his sister and two nieces in the Cathedral precinct at Canterbury. He died at Cheyne Gardens in Chelsea in May 1902 aged 64 leaving an estate worth more than £25,000.

References

External links

1837 births
1902 deaths
Sportspeople from Canterbury
English cricketers
Kent cricketers
Gentlemen of Kent cricketers